The list of glassware includes drinking vessels (drinkware) and tableware used to set a table for eating a meal, general glass items such as vases, and glasses used in the catering industry. It does not include laboratory glassware.

Drinkware

Drinkware, beverageware (in other words, cups) is a general term for a vessel intended to contain beverages or liquid foods for drinking or consumption. 
 Beaker
 Beer glassware
 Bottle
 Coffee cup
 Cup
 Dwarf ale glass
 Heavy baluster glass
 Jar
 Mazagran
 Mug
 Pythagorean cup
 Quaich
 Sake cup (ochoko)
 Stemware
 Tazza
 Teacup
 Trembleuse
 Tumblers
 Vitrolero

The word cup comes from Middle English , from Old English, from Late Latin , drinking vessel, perhaps variant of Latin , tub, cask. The first known use of the word cup is before the 12th century.

Tumblers

Tumblers are flat-bottomed drinking glasses.
 Collins glass, for a tall mixed drink
 Dizzy cocktail glass, a glass with a wide, shallow bowl, comparable to a normal cocktail glass but without the stem
 Faceted glass or 
 Highball glass, for mixed drinks
 Iced tea glass
 Juice glass, for fruit juices and vegetable juices.
 Old fashioned glass, traditionally, for a simple cocktail or liquor "on the rocks" or "neat". Contemporary American "rocks" glasses may be much larger, and used for a variety of beverages over ice
 Shot glass, a small glass for up to four ounces of liquor. The modern shot glass has a thicker base and sides than the older whiskey glass.
 Water glass
 Whiskey tumbler, a small, thin-walled glass for a straight shot of liquor

Beer glassware

 Beer boot
 Beer bottle
 Beer stein, large mug traditionally with a hinged lid
 Berkemeyer
 Glass, 200ml (7 fl. oz.) Australian beer glass (Queensland and Victoria)
 Handle, 425ml New Zealand beer glass
 Jug, 750–1000ml served at pubs in New Zealand
 Middy, 285ml (10 fl. oz.) Australian beer glass (New South Wales)
 Pilsner glass, for pale lager
 Pint glass, for an imperial pint of beer or cider
 Pony glass, for a 140ml of beer, a "short" or "small" beer
 Pot glass
 Pot, 285ml (10 fl. oz.) Australian beer glass (Queensland and Victoria)
 Schooner, 425ml (15 fl. oz.) Australian beer glass, 285 ml (10 fl. oz.) in South Australia
 Tankard, a large drinking cup, usually with a handle and a hinged cover
 Wheat beer glass, for wheat beer
 Yard glass, a very tall, conical beer glass, with a round ball base, usually hung on a wall when empty

Stemware

 Absinthe glass, a short, thick-stemmed glass with a tall, wide bowl and some feature (like a ridge, bead, or bulge) indicating a correct serving of absinthe
 Chalice or goblet, an ornate stem glass, especially one for ceremonial purposes
 Champagne coupe, a stem glass with a wide, shallow bowl, for champagne (similar to a cocktail glass)
 Champagne flute, a stem glass with a tall, narrow bowl, for champagne
 Cocktail glass, a stem glass with a wide, shallow bowl, for cocktails
 Fountain glass, a tall fluted stem glass common in soda fountains, family restaurants and 24-hour diner-style restaurants for milkshakes and ice cream sodas
 Glencairn whisky glass, a wide bowl with a narrow mouth, similar to a snifter's, but with a shorter, sturdier base, designed for whisky
 Hurricane glass (poco grande glass)
 Margarita glass (variant of champagne coupe)
 Nick & Nora
 Rummer
 Sherbet, a stem glass for ice cream or sorbet
 Sherry glass
 Snifter, a liquor glass with a short stem and a wide bowl that narrows at the top, for brandy and liquor
 Wine glass, a stem glass

Other
 Art glass, glassware that is modern art
 Laboratory glassware, a variety of equipment, traditionally made of glass, used for scientific experiments
 Pitcher, a container, usually with a spout for pouring its contents
 Punch bowl, a bowl that punch is put in, generally used in parties
 Vase, an open container often used to hold flowers
 Bong, a smoking device often made from glass
 Peking glass, a Chinese form of overlay glass, often in the form of snuff boxes or vases
 Penny lick

See also

 Beverage coaster, a flat ceramic or wood piece that protects tables
 Bottle (List of bottle types, brands and companies)
 Chip work, a form of engraved glassware

References

External links

Alcohol-related lists
Bartending
Cocktails
Drinkware
Glass applications
Mixed drinks